

Primera División

League table

Top scorers

Liguilla Pre-Libertadores

Relegation

Relegation playoff

Argentine clubs in international competitions

References

Argentina 1989-1990 by Pablo Ciullini  at rsssf.
Argentina 1980s by Osvaldo José Gorgazzi and Victor Hugo Kurhy at rsssf.
Copa Libertadores 1990 by Frank Ballesteros and Karel Stokkermans at rsssf.
Supercopa 1989 by Julio Bovi Diogo and Guillermo Rivera at rsssf